The University of Kentucky College of Health Sciences (UKCHS) is a college within the University of Kentucky Medical Center focused on nine health science disciplines. It is located in the city of Lexington, Kentucky, United States. UKCHS has more than 1300 enrolled students with more than 68 faculty and is becoming more and more popular. The UKCHS is very competitive and has the highest four-year graduation rate on campus. Students after graduation go onto study diseases and how they affect the human body and many other health related careers.

Programs 
 
Department of Health and Clinical Sciences

Department of Athletic Training and Clinical Nutrition

Department of Communication Sciences and Disorders

Department of Physical Therapy

Department of Physician Assistant Studies

Undergraduate
 Clinical Leadership and Management
 Communication Sciences & Disorders
 Human Health Sciences 
 Medical Laboratory Science
 Minor in Health Advocacy
 Clinical Healthcare Management Certificate
 Undergraduate Certificate in Research in Human Health Sciences 
 Certificate in Nutrition For Human Performance

Graduate/Professional
 Athletic Training
 Clinical Nutrition (in collaboration with the College of Medicine)
 Communication Sciences & Disorders
 Physical Therapy
 Physician Assistant Studies
 Rehabilitation Sciences Doctoral Program

References 

Health Sciences
Educational institutions established in 1966
1966 establishments in Kentucky